This is a list of association football players that have scored three goals (a hat-trick) or more in a single match in the Indonesia Super League (now Liga 1). The league, which started in 2008, is the top-tier of Indonesian league football replacing the Liga Indonesia Premier Division, thus transforming the competition into a double round-robin system. The first player to achieve the feat was Cristian Gonzáles, who scored three times for Persik Kediri in a 4–0 victory over PSIS Semarang. Until now there are nine players who have scored four goals in a match, and there are only two players who can score 5 goals in one game. The forward Persipura Jayapura, Boaz Solossa, is the player who scored the most hat-tricks in ISL and Liga 1 to date.

Hat-tricks

Multiple hat-tricks
The following table lists the minimum number of hat-tricks scored by players who have scored two or more hat-tricks. Players in italics are still active outside the Liga 1.

Players in bold  are still active in the Liga 1.

Hat-tricks by nationality
The following table lists the number of hat-tricks scored by players from a single nation.

Note:
Cristian Gonzáles scored 3 hat-tricks when he was still an Uruguay citizen and 2 hat-tricks when he was an Indonesian citizen.
Greg Nwokolo scored 2 hat-tricks when he was still a Nigeria citizen and 2 hat-tricks when he was an Indonesian citizen.
Ilija Spasojević scored 3 hat-tricks when he was still a Montenegrin citizen and 1 hat-trick when he was an Indonesian citizen.

Hat-tricks by club
The following table lists the number of hat-tricks scored by players from certain clubs.

Notes:

See also
 Indonesia Super League
 Football records in Indonesia

References

Hat-trick
Indonesia Super League